In mathematics, the triangle inequality states that for any triangle, the sum of the lengths of any two sides must be greater than or equal to the length of the remaining side. This statement permits the inclusion of degenerate triangles, but some authors, especially those writing about elementary geometry, will exclude this possibility, thus leaving out the possibility of equality.

with equality only in the degenerate case of a triangle with zero area.
In Euclidean geometry and some other geometries, the triangle inequality is a theorem about distances, and it is written using vectors and vector lengths (norms):

where the length  of the third side has been replaced by the vector sum .

In Euclidean geometry, for right triangles the triangle inequality is a consequence of the Pythagorean theorem, and for general triangles, a consequence of the law of cosines. For the law of cosines to prove triangle-inequality, the angle in a triangle is lower bounded by zero, so the cosine term is at most one, and the side length of the third side follows. It may be proved without these theorems. The figure at the right shows three examples beginning with clear inequality (top) and approaching equality (bottom). In the Euclidean case, equality occurs only if the triangle has a  angle and two  angles, making the three vertices collinear, as shown in the bottom example. Thus, in Euclidean geometry, the shortest distance between two points is a straight line.

In spherical geometry, the shortest distance between two points is an arc of a great circle, but the triangle inequality holds provided the restriction is made that the distance between two points on a sphere is the length of a minor spherical line segment (that is, one with central angle in ) with those endpoints.

The triangle inequality is a defining property of norms and measures of distance. This property must be established as a theorem for any function proposed for such purposes for each particular space: for example, spaces such as the real numbers, Euclidean spaces, the Lp spaces, and inner product spaces.

Euclidean geometry

Euclid proved the triangle inequality for distances in plane geometry using the construction in the figure. It then is argued that angle  has larger measure than angle , so side  is longer than side . This proof appears in Euclid's Elements, Book 1, Proposition 20.

Mathematical expression of the constraint on the sides of a triangle

A more succinct form of this inequality system can be shown to be

Another way to state it is

implying

and thus that the longest side length is less than the semiperimeter.

A mathematically equivalent formulation is that the area of a triangle with sides a, b, c must be a real number greater than zero. Heron's formula for the area is

In terms of either area expression, the triangle inequality imposed on all sides is equivalent to the condition that the expression under the square root sign be real and greater than zero (so the area expression is real and greater than zero).

Right triangle

In the case of right triangles, the triangle inequality specializes to the statement that the hypotenuse is greater than either of the two sides and less than their sum.

The second part of this theorem is already established above for any side of any triangle. The first part is established using the lower figure. In the figure, consider the right triangle . An isosceles triangle  is constructed with equal sides . From the triangle postulate, the angles in the right triangle  satisfy:

Likewise, in the isosceles triangle , the angles satisfy:

Therefore,

and so, in particular,

That means side  opposite angle  is shorter than side  opposite the larger angle . But . Hence:

A similar construction shows , establishing the theorem.

This theorem establishing inequalities is sharpened by Pythagoras' theorem to the equality that the square of the length of the hypotenuse equals the sum of the squares of the other two sides.

Examples of use
Then the triangle inequality requires that

To satisfy all these inequalities requires

Then the triangle inequality requires that

The first inequality requires ; consequently it can be divided through and eliminated. With , the middle inequality only requires . This now leaves the first and third inequalities needing to satisfy

The first of these quadratic inequalities requires  to range in the region beyond the value of the positive root of the quadratic equation , i.e.   where  is the golden ratio. The second quadratic inequality requires  to range between 0 and the positive root of the quadratic equation , i.e. . The combined requirements result in  being confined to the range

When  the common ratio is chosen such that  it generates a right triangle that is always similar to the Kepler triangle.

Generalization to any polygon
The triangle inequality can be extended by mathematical induction to arbitrary polygonal paths, showing that the total length of such a path is no less than the length of the straight line between its endpoints. Consequently, the length of any polygon side is always less than the sum of the other polygon side lengths.

Example of the generalized polygon inequality for a quadrilateral
Then the generalized polygon inequality requires that

These inequalities for  reduce to the following

The left-hand side polynomials of these two inequalities have roots that are the tribonacci constant and its reciprocal. Consequently,  is limited to the range  where  is the tribonacci constant.

Relationship with shortest paths

This generalization can be used to prove that the shortest curve between two points in Euclidean geometry is a straight line.

No polygonal path between two points is shorter than the line between them. This implies that no curve can have an arc length less than the distance between its endpoints. By definition, the arc length of a curve is the least upper bound of the lengths of all polygonal approximations of the curve. The result for polygonal paths shows that the straight line between the endpoints is the shortest of all the polygonal approximations. Because the arc length of the curve is greater than or equal to the length of every polygonal approximation, the curve itself cannot be shorter than the straight line path.

Converse

The converse of the triangle inequality theorem is also true: if three real numbers are such that each is less than the sum of the others, then there exists a triangle with these numbers as its side lengths and with positive area; and if one number equals the sum of the other two, there exists a degenerate triangle (that is, with zero area) with these numbers as its side lengths.

In either case, if the side lengths are a, b, c we can attempt to place a triangle in the Euclidean plane as shown in the diagram. We need to prove that there exists a real number h consistent with the values a, b, and c, in which case this triangle exists.

By the Pythagorean theorem we have  and  according to the figure at the right. Subtracting these yields . This equation allows us to express  in terms of the sides of the triangle:

For the height of the triangle we have that . By replacing  with the formula given above, we have

For a real number h to satisfy this,  must be non-negative:

which holds if the triangle inequality is satisfied for all sides. Therefore there does exist a real number h consistent with the sides a, b, c, and the triangle exists. If each triangle inequality holds strictly, h > 0 and the triangle is non-degenerate (has positive area); but if one of the inequalities holds with equality, so h = 0, the triangle is degenerate.

Generalization to higher dimensions

The area of a triangular face of a tetrahedron is less than or equal to the sum of the areas of the other three triangular faces.  More generally, in Euclidean space the hypervolume of an -facet of an -simplex is less than or equal to the sum of the hypervolumes of the other  facets.  

Much as the triangle inequality generalizes to a polygon inequality, the inequality for a simplex of any dimension generalizes to a polytope of any dimension: the hypervolume of any facet of a polytope is less than or equal to the sum of the hypervolumes of the remaining facets.

In some cases the tetrahedral inequality is stronger than several applications of the triangle inequality.

and
.

Normed vector space

In a normed vector space , one of the defining properties of the norm is the triangle inequality:

that is, the norm of the sum of two vectors is at most as large as the sum of the norms of the two vectors.  This is also referred to as subadditivity. For any proposed function to behave as a norm, it must satisfy this requirement.
If the normed space is euclidean, or, more generally, strictly convex, then  if and
This property characterizes strictly convex normed spaces such as
However, there are normed spaces in which this is
not true. For instance, consider the plane with the  norm (the Manhattan distance) and
Then the triangle formed by

Example norms
Absolute value as norm for the real line. To be a norm, the triangle inequality requires that the absolute value satisfy for any real numbers  and :  which it does.

Proof:

After adding, 

Use the fact that 
(with b replaced by x+y and a by ), we have

The triangle inequality is useful in mathematical analysis for determining the best upper estimate on the size of the sum of two numbers, in terms of the sizes of the individual numbers.

There is also a lower estimate, which can be found using the reverse triangle inequality which states that for any real numbers  and :

Inner product as norm in an inner product space.
{|
| || 
|-
| || 
|-
| || 
|-
| ||  (by the Cauchy–Schwarz inequality)
|-
| || .
|}

The Cauchy–Schwarz inequality turns into an equality if and only if  and 
are linearly dependent. The inequality

turns into an equality for linearly dependent  and  

Taking the square root of the final result gives the triangle inequality.
For  the -norm becomes the Euclidean norm:  which is Pythagoras' theorem in -dimensions, a very special case corresponding to an inner product norm. Except for the case , the -norm is not an inner product norm, because it does not satisfy the parallelogram law. It takes the form:

Metric space
In a metric space  with metric , the triangle inequality is a requirement upon distance:

The triangle inequality is responsible for most of the interesting structure on a metric space, namely, convergence. This is because the remaining requirements for a metric are rather simplistic in comparison.

Reverse triangle inequality
The reverse triangle inequality is an elementary consequence of the triangle inequality that gives lower bounds instead of upper bounds. For plane geometry, the statement is:

Any side of a triangle is greater than or equal to the difference between the other two sides.

In the case of a normed vector space, the statement is:
 
or for metric spaces, .
This implies that the norm  as well as the distance function  are Lipschitz continuous with Lipschitz constant , and therefore are in particular uniformly continuous.

The proof for the reverse triangle uses the regular triangle inequality, and :
 
 

Combining these two statements gives:

Triangle inequality for cosine similarity

By applying the cosine function to the triangle inequality and reverse triangle inequality for arc lengths and employing the angle addition and subtraction formulas for cosines, it follows immediately that

and

Reversal in Minkowski space

The Minkowski space metric  is not positive-definite, which means that  can have either sign or vanish, even if the vector x is non-zero. Moreover, if x and y are both timelike vectors lying in the future light cone, the triangle inequality is reversed:

 

A physical example of this inequality is the twin paradox in special relativity. The same reversed form of the inequality holds if both vectors lie in the past light cone, and if one or both are null vectors. The result holds in n + 1 dimensions for any n ≥ 1.  If the plane defined by x and y is spacelike (and therefore a Euclidean subspace) then the usual triangle inequality holds.

See also
 Subadditivity
 Minkowski inequality
 Ptolemy's inequality

Notes

References
 .
 .

External links

Geometric inequalities
Linear algebra
Metric geometry
Articles containing proofs
Theorems in geometry